Anopheles crucians is a mosquito that exists in aquatic environments under areas with little light presence. The preferred environment for A. crucians is areas with acidic water such as that found in cypress swamps. The mosquito breeds in semipermanent and permanent pools, ponds, lakes and swamps.

It may be a vector for malaria.

Anatomy 
The anatomy of A. crucians is very similar to that of Anopheles bradleyi. The proboscis is dark colored and black like that of other mosquitoes. The pedipalps, composed of six segments, are different colors based on the segment. The basal part is black with raised scales, segment 3 has white scales, the 4th segment has white-ringed basally and apically, and the last segment is white. The abdomen ranges from dark brown to black with hundreds of yellow to dark-brown hairs. The legs are dark with white patched in the femora and tibiae. The wings, on average, are 4.0 millimeters in length and will have white-yellow scales with contrasting spots.

Malaria vector 
In research conducted by W.V. King in 1916, it was discovered that Anopheles female mosquitoes are carriers of malaria. In this research, 75% of A. crucians individuals were infected with oocysts, sporozoites, or both of the malarial parasite Plasmodium falciparum.

References

External links 
 Walter Reed Biosystematic Unit Characteristics, Bionomics, Medical Importance
 GeoSpecies Knowledge Base University of Wisconsin

Insect vectors of human pathogens
crucians
Insects described in 1828